George Haddock may refer to:
 George Haddock (baseball) (1866–1926), American Major League Baseball pitcher
 George Haddock (musician) (1876-1907), British Musician, former owner of the Stradivarius Emperor Violin. 
 George Haddock (politician) (1863–1930), British Conservative Party Member of Parliament (MP) for North Lonsdale 1906–1918